The  is a Go competition.  The Women's Meijin is the female version of the Meijin title.  This title is sponsored by Fuji Evening Newspaper and Nippon Life Insurance.  The winner's purse is 5,100,000 Yen ($48,000).

The tournament was not held in 2020 due to loss of sponsorship, but resumed for the 32nd tournament in 2021 with a new sponsor.

Past winners

Winners in chronological order:

Winners by number of titles:

References

External links
Nihon Ki-in archive (in Japanese)

Go competitions in Japan
Nippon Life